Monagrillo may refer to:
Monagrillo (corregimiento)
Monagrillo (archaeological site)